Textual variants in the Book of Judges concerns textual variants in the Hebrew Bible found in the Book of Judges.

Legend

List 

This list provides examples of known textual variants, and contains the following parameters: Hebrew texts written right to left, the Hebrew text romanised left to right, an approximate English translation, and which Hebrew manuscripts or critical editions of the Hebrew Bible this textual variant can be found in. Greek (Septuagint) and Latin (Vulgate) texts are written left to right, and not romanised. Sometimes additional translation or interpretation notes are added, with references to similar verses elsewhere, or in-depth articles on the topic in question.
 Judges 1 
Judges 1:18

 Judges 15 
Judges 15:5
  – WLC
  – LXX APB

 Judges 18 
Judges 18:7
  – WLC
  – B LXX LXX Brenton (ἔχουσι)
  – LXX
  – A APB
  Vg
 See also Dan (ancient city) § Laish.

Judges 18:30
  – 'many Hebrew manuscripts, some Septuagint manuscripts and Vulgate'.
  – 'many other Hebrew manuscripts and some other Septuagint manuscripts'
  – LXX
  – APB
 "Moses" is thought to be the original reading, which was later changed to "Manasseh" in some manuscripts (but not all) by adding a nun in superscript, in order 'to avoid saying that the grandson of Moses became a priest of false gods'.
 See also Judges 18 § Verse 30 and Gershom § Priestly connections.

 Judges 19 
Judges 19:2, see also Levite's concubine
  wat-tiz-neh ‘ā-lāw pî-laḡ-šōw, (But his concubine was unfaithful to him, or But his concubine played the harlot against him, or But his concubine was angry at him,) – WLC
 It is disputed whether the first word is derived from  zaná (H2181 "to commit fornication/adultery/harlotry, to be a harlot, to play the harlot, to prostitute"), or  zanákh (H2186 "to reject, spurn, be angry with/at, cast away (off), remove far away (off), desert"). Traditionally, translators and interpreters have followed the former verb, but some modern scholars prefer the latter verb because this meaning aligns much better with the Greek texts.
 καὶ ἐπορεύθη ἀπ᾽ αὐτοῦ ἡ παλλακὴ αὐτοῦ (And his concubine departed from him) – LXX Brenton
 και ωργίσθη αυτώ η παλλακή αυτού (And his concubine provoked him to anger) – ABP
  – Vg Vg

Judges 19:2, see also Levite's concubine
 καὶ ἀπῆλθεν παρ᾽ αὐτοῦ εἰς οἶκον πατρὸς αὐτῆς (and went away from him to the house of her father) – LXX
 καὶ ἀπῆλθε παρ᾽ αὐτοῦ εἰς οἶκον πατρὸς αὐτῆς (and went away from him to the house of her father) – Brenton
 και απήλθε απ' αυτού εις τον οίκον του πατρός αυτής (and she went forth from him unto the house of her father) – ABP
  – Vg Vg

Judges 19:2, see also Levite's concubine
  wat-tə-hî- šām yā-mîm ’ar-bā-‘āh ḥo-ḏā-šîm. (and was there the days of four months) – WLC
 καὶ ἦν ἐκεῖ ἡμέρας δ᾽ μηνῶν (and [she] was there days and months) – LXX
 καὶ ἦν ἐκεῖ ἡμέρας μηνῶν τεσσαρων (and she was there four months) – Brenton
 και εγένετο εκεί ημέρας τετράμηνον (and she was there the days of four months) – ABP 
  – Vg Vg

Judges 19:3, see also Levite's concubine
 ὀπίσω (after) – LXX Brenton
 κατόπισθεν (after or behind) – ABP
  – Vg Vg

Judges 19:3, see also Levite's concubine
 τοῦ λαλῆσαι ἐπὶ καρδίαν αὐτῆς (to speak unto her heart) – LXX Brenton
 του λαλήσαι επί την καρδίαν αυτής (to speak unto the heart of her) – ABP
  – Vg Vg

Judges 19:3, see also Levite's concubine
  la-hă-šî-ḇōw, ([and] bring him back) – K
  la-hă-šî-ḇāh, ([and] bring her back) – Q
 τοῦ ἐπιστρέψαι αὐτὴν αὐτῷ (to turn her over to him) – LXX Brenton. ἐπιστρέψαι is a probable misspelling of ἐπιτρέπω
 του διαλλάξαι αυτήν (to reconcile her or to change her mind) – ABP
  – Vg Vg

Judges 19:3, see also Levite's concubine
  wə-na-‘ă-rōw ‘im-mōw wə-ṣe-meḏ ḥă-mō-rîm; (and [having his] young man/boy/servant with [him] and a pair of donkeys) – WLC
 καὶ νεανίας αὐτοῦ μετ᾽ αὐτοῦ καὶ ζεῦγος ὄνων. (And his young man [was] with him and a pair of donkeys or and he had his young man with him, and a pair of asses) – LXX Brenton
 και το παιδάριον αυτού μετ᾽ αυτού καὶ ζεύγος υποζυγίων. (And his little boy [was] with him and a pair of beasts of burden) – ABP
  – Vg Vg

Judges 19:3, see also Levite's concubine
 καὶ ἥδε εἰσήνεγκεν αὐτὸν εἰς οἶκον (and she brought him into the house) – LXX Brenton. εἰσήνεγκεν = εἰς ("into" or "to(wards)") + φέρω ("to bring") aorist third person singular
 και επορεύθη έως οίκου (and he went/travelled unto/until the house) – ABP
  – Vg Vg

Judges 19:4, see also Levite's concubine
  way-ye-ḥĕ-zaq- bōw (detained/restrained him or persuaded him to stay) – WLC
 κατέσχεν αὐτὸν (constrained him) – LXX Brenton
 εισήγαγεν αυτόν (brought him in) – ABP
  – Vg Vg

Judges 19:4, see also Levite's concubine
 ἐπὶ (for or during) – LXX Brenton
 omitted – WLC ABP Vg Vg

Judges 19:4, see also Levite's concubine
  way-yā-lî-nū ([they] lodged) – WLC
 ηὐλίσθησαν ([they] spent the night or lodged) – LXX Brenton
 ύπνωσαν ([they] slept) – ABP
 omitted – Vg Vg

Judges 19:18, see also Levite's concubine
  wə-’eṯ- bêṯ Yah-weh ’ă-nî hō-lêḵ, (and [now] to the house of Yahweh I am going) – WLC Syriac Targum
 καὶ εἰς τὸν οἶκόν μου ἐγὼ πορεύομαι· (and to my house I am walking) – LXX Brenton
 και εις τον οίκον μου εγώ αποτρέχω (and to my house I am returning) – ABP. αποτρέχω is a probable misspelling of :wikt:ἀποτρέπω
  – Vg Vg

Judges 19:24, see also Levite's concubine
  hin-nêh ḇit-tî hab-bə-ṯū-lāh (Behold my virgin daughter) – WLC
 ἴδε ἡ θυγάτηρ μου ἡ παρθένος (Behold [singular] the daughter of mine, the virgin) – LXX Brenton
 ιδού θυγάτηρ μου η παρθένος (Behold [plural] my daughter, the virgin) – ABP
  – Vg Vg

Judges 19:24, see also Levite's concubine
  ’ō-w-ṣî-’āh- nā wə-‘an-nū ’ō-w-ṯām, (Let me bring them out now, and you rape/force [sexually]/defile/violate/ravish/mistreat/humble/humiliate them) – WLC
 ἐξάξω αὐτάς, καὶ ταπεινώσατε αὐτὰς (And I will bring them out, and you humble/humiliate them,) – LXX Brenton ABP
  – Vg Vg

Judges 19:24, see also Levite's concubine
  wə-lā-’îš haz-zeh lō ṯa-‘ă-śū, də-ḇar han-nə-ḇā-lāh haz-zōṯ. (but unto this man do not so vile a thing (KJV) or but to this man do not commit this rape/folly/villainy/foolishness or vile/disgraceful act/thing/outrage) WLC
 καὶ τῷ ἀνδρὶ τούτῳ οὐ ποιήσετε τὸ ῥῆμα τῆς ἀφροσύνης ταύτης. (but to this man you do not do this folly) – LXX
 και τω ανδρί τούτω μη ποιήσητε το ρήμα της αφροσύνης ταύτης. (but to this man you should not do the thing of this folly or but to this man do not this folly) –  Brenton ABP
  – Vg Vg

Judges 19:25, see also Levite's concubine
  way-yê-ḏə-‘ū ’ō-w-ṯāh way-yiṯ-‘al-lə-lū- ḇāh kāl- hal-lay-lāh ‘aḏ- hab-bō-qer, (And they knew / had sexual relations with / raped her, and they mocked//abused/dealt severely with her the entire night until morning) – WLC
 καὶ ἔγνωσαν αὐτήν, καὶ ἐνέπαιζον ἐν αὐτῇ ὅλην τὴν νύκτα ἕως πρωί (And they knew / had sex with / raped her, and they mocked/ridiculed/abused her the entire night until morning) – LXX
 καὶ ἔγνωσαν αὐτήν, καὶ ἐνέπαιζον ἐν αὐτῇ ὅλην τὴν νύκτα ἕως τοπρωί (And they knew / had sex with / raped her, and they mocked/ridiculed/abused her the entire night until the morning) – Brenton
 και έγνωσαν αυτήν και ενέπαιξαν αυτή όλην την νύκτα έως τοπρωϊ (And they knew / had sex with / raped her and mocked/ridiculed/abused her the entire night until the morning) – ABP
  – Vg Vg

Judges 19:25, see also Levite's concubine
  way-šal-lə-ḥū-hā ba-‘ă-lō-wṯ haš-šā-ḥar. (and when they let her go, the day began to spring.) – K
  way-šal-lə-ḥū-hā ka-‘ă-lō-wṯ haš-šā-ḥar. (and when they let her go, the day began to break.) – Q
 καὶ ἐξαπέστειλαν αὐτὴν ὡς ἀνέβη τὸ πρωί. (and let her go when the morning dawned.) – LXX Brenton
 και εξαπέστειλαν αυτήν άμα τω ανέβη τον όρθρον (and they sent her away at the same time the daybreak ascended.) – ABP
  – Vg Vg

Judges 19:28, see also Levite's concubine
  way-yō-mer ’ê-le-hā (And he said to her) – WLC
 καὶ εἶπεν πρὸς αὐτήν (And he said to her) – LXX
 και είπε προς αυτήν (And he said to her) – Brenton ABP
  – Vg Vg

Judges 19:28, see also Levite's concubine
  wə-’ên ‘ō-neh; (But [she] did not answer.) – WLC
 καὶ οὐκ ἀπεκρίθη, ὅτι ἦν νεκρά. (And she did not answer, because she was dead.) – LXX Brenton
 και ουκ απεκρίθη αυτώ αλλά τεθνήκει (And she did not answer to him, for she had died) – ABP Brenton
  – Vg Vg

Judges 19:28, see also Levite's concubine
 τὸν ὄνον (the donkey) – LXX Brenton
 το υποζύγιον (the beast of burden) – ABP

Judges 19:29, see also Levite's concubine
  way-yā-ḇō ’el- bê-ṯōw, (And when he entered into his house) – WLC
 και εισήλθεν εις τον οίκον αυτού (And he entered into his house) – ABP
  – Vg Vg
 omitted – LXX Brenton

Judges 19:29, see also Levite's concubine
  ham-ma-’ă-ḵe-leṯ (a knife) – WLC. A מאכלת (ma'akhélet) was a "knife for slaughtering, butchering, carving"
 τὴν ῥομφαίαν (a rhomphaia or his sword) – LXX Brenton
 την μάχαιραν (a makhaira or the knife) – ABP
  – Vg Vg

Judges 19:29, see also Levite's concubine
 ἐκράτησεν (seized) – LXX
 ἐκράτησε (seized) – Brenton
 επελάβετο (took hold of) – ABP

Judges 19:29, see also Levite's concubine
  la-‘ă-ṣā-me-hā, (limb by limb) – WLC
 κατά τα όστα αυτής (according to her bones) – ABP
  – Vg Vg
 omitted – LXX Brenton

Judges 19:29, see also Levite's concubine
  bə-ḵōl gə-ḇūl yiś-rā-’êl. (throughout the territory of Israel) – WLC
 ἐν παντὶ ὁρίῳ Ἰσραήλ (to all borders of Israel or to every coast of Israel) – LXX Brenton
 εις πάσας τας φυλάς Ισραήλ (to all the tribes of Israel) – ABP
  – Vg Vg

 Judges 20 
Judges 20:03, see also Levite's concubine
  – WLC
  – LXX Brenton
  – ABP
  – Vg Vg

Judges 20:05, see also Levite's concubine
  – WLC
  – LXX Brenton
  – ABP
  – Vg Vg

Judges 20:05, see also Levite's concubine
  – WLC
  – LXX 
  – Brenton
  – ABP
  – Vg Vg

 Judges 21 
Judges 21:10, see also Levite's concubine
  – WLC
  – ABP
  – Vg
 omitted – LXX Brenton

Judges 21:11, see also Levite's concubine
  – WLC
  – LXX Brenton
  – ABP
  – Vg

Judges 21:11, see also Levite's concubine
  – WLC
  – LXX Brenton
  – ABP
  – Vg
 Compare Numbers 31:17.

Judges 21:11, see also Levite's concubine
  – LXX 
  – Brenton
  – Vg
 omitted – WLC ABP
 Compare Numbers 31:18.

Judges 21:12, see also Levite's concubine
  – WLC
  – LXX Brenton
  – ABP
  – Vg

Judges 21:12, see also Levite's concubine
  – WLC
  – LXX
  – Brenton
  – ABP
  – Vg

Judges 21:14, see also Levite's concubine
  – WLC
  – LXX Brenton ABP
  – Vg

Judges 21:14, see also Levite's concubine
  – WLC
  – LXX Brenton
  – ABP
  – Vg

Judges 21:14, see also Levite's concubine
  – WLC
  – LXX
  – Brenton
  – ABP
  – Vg

Judges 21:14, see also Levite's concubine
  – WLC
  – LXX Brenton ABP
  – Brenton
  – Vg

Judges 21:17, see also Levite's concubine
  – WLC
  – LXX Brenton
  – ABP
  – Vg

Judges 21:22, see also Levite's concubine
  – K
  – Q

Judges 21:22, see also Levite's concubine
  – WLC
  – LXX
  – Brenton ABP
  – Vg

Judges 21:22, see also Levite's concubine
  – WLC
  – LXX Brenton
  – ABP
  – Vg

Judges 21:25
  – WLC
  – LXX Brenton
  – ABP
  – Vg

See also 
 List of Hebrew Bible manuscripts

Notes

References

Bibliography 
 
 
 
 
  (E-book edition)
 
 Emanuel Tov, The Text-Critical Use of the Septuagint in Biblical Research (TCU), 1981 (1st edition), 1997 (2nd edition), 2015 (3rd edition).
 Emanuel Tov, Textual Criticism of the Hebrew Bible (TCHB), 1992 (1st edition), 2001 (2nd edition), 2012 (3rd edition).
 Emanuel Tov, Textual Criticism of the Hebrew Bible, Qumran, Septuagint: Collected Writings, Volume 3 (2015).

External links 
 Digitized Hebrew and Greek Manuscripts: Access and Issues – Introduction to online biblical textual studies

Biblical criticism
Early versions of the Bible
Book of Judges
Hebrew Bible versions and translations
Jewish manuscripts
Old Testament-related lists
Septuagint manuscripts
Textual criticism